Cethegus is a genus of Australian spiders in the family Euagridae. It was first described by Tamerlan Thorell in 1881.

Species
 it contained twelve species:
Cethegus barraba Raven, 1984 – Australia (New South Wales)
Cethegus broomi (Hogg, 1901) – Australia (New South Wales)
Cethegus colemani Raven, 1984 – Australia (Queensland)
Cethegus daemeli Raven, 1984 – Australia (Queensland)
Cethegus elegans Raven, 1984 – Australia (Queensland)
Cethegus fugax (Simon, 1908) – Australia (Western Australia, South Australia)
Cethegus hanni Raven, 1984 – Australia (Queensland)
Cethegus ischnotheloides Raven, 1985 – Australia (South Australia)
Cethegus lugubris Thorell, 1881 (type) – Australia (Queensland)
Cethegus multispinosus Raven, 1984 – Australia (Queensland)
Cethegus pallipes Raven, 1984 – Australia (Queensland)
Cethegus robustus Raven, 1984 – Australia (Queensland)

References

Euagridae
Mygalomorphae genera
Taxa named by Tamerlan Thorell